The Milad Tower (lit. Birth Tower), also known as the Tehran Tower, is a multi-purpose tower in Tehran, Iran. It is the sixth-tallest tower and the 24th-tallest freestanding structure in the world.

It is located between Shahrak-e Gharb and the district of Gisha, standing at 435 meters from the base to the tip of the antenna. The head consists of a large pod with 12 floors, the roof of which is at 315 meters.

The tower is a part of the International Trade and Convention Center of Tehran, which also includes a five-star hotel, a convention center, a world trade center and an IT park.

History

Background
The Milad Tower was part of the Shahestan Pahlavi project, a vast development for a new government and commercial centre for Tehran, that was designed in the 1970s but never materialized, except for the tower. After an international competition, the project was awarded to the Llewely Davies Company, and construction was inaugurated on August 19, 1975, with the Mohammad Reza Pahlavi and the Mayor of Tehran Dr G. R. Nickpay burying a commemorative gold plaque . There is also another background of building this tower, since the construction of the tower was started after the 1979 revolution. The new government of Iran wanted to create a new symbol for Tehran to replace the Azadi Tower that was a symbol of Pahlavi's reign.

Construction

The construction of the tower was commenced in 1997. Upon completion of its construction in the mid 2000s, the Milad Tower was considered the fourth-tallest freestanding telecommunication tower in the world. While the tower opened in 2007, numerous conflicts on the history of the tower still prevail, partly because sections of the tower were open to visitors once the elevators started operating during construction and the tower was still far from finished.

The design of the project was headed by Iranian architect Mohammad Reza Hafezi. The general contractor was the company of Boland Payeh, and the main client and investor was the company of Yadman Sazeh, a representative of the Municipality of Tehran.

Structure and features

It consists of five main parts, including the foundation, transition (lobby) structure, shaft, head structure and the antenna mast.

The lobby structure consists of six floors. The first and second underground floors consist of installing sections and a data center. The ground floor is dedicated to the entrance and the gatehouse.

The head of the tower is a steel structure weighing about 25,000 tonnes and consisting of 12 floors. The top floors of the tower include a public art gallery, a cafeteria, a revolving restaurant, a VIP restaurant, telecommunication floors, mechanical floors, fire-immune areas built as a refuge zone, a closed observation deck, an open observation deck, and a sky dome.

The lower floor of the mast is for the adjustment of public users' telecommunication antennas, and the three upper floors are dedicated to the antenna of the Islamic Republic of Iran Broadcasting.

The Milad Tower has an octagonal base, symbolizing traditional Iranian architecture.

Gallery

Ranks
 Sixth-tallest freestanding tower in the world
 24th-tallest freestanding structure in the world

See also 
 Fernsehturm Stuttgart – prototype (first TV tower built from concrete)
 List of revolving restaurants
 List of tallest buildings in Tehran
 International rankings of Iran

References

External links 
 

Amphitheaters
Architecture in Iran
Articles containing video clips
Buildings and structures in Tehran
Buildings and structures with revolving restaurants
Concert halls in Iran
Islamic Republic of Iran era architecture
Tourist attractions in Tehran
Towers completed in 2007
Towers in Iran
Towers with revolving restaurants